Darakht-e Tut or Derakht-e Tut or Derakht Tut may refer to:
 Derakht-e Tut, Razavi Khorasan
 Darakht-e Tut, South Khorasan